Checkmate is an album by American jazz guitarist Joe Pass and pianist Jimmy Rowles that was released in 1981. It was re-issued in 1998 on CD by Original Jazz Classics.

Reception

Writing for Allmusic, music critic Scott Yanow wrote of the album "Rowles sets the quiet mood, and Pass keeps his amplifier quite low and was content to play on the pianist's turf. The emphasis is on slower tempos and harmonically sophisticated chords... Superior background music that rewards close listening."

Track listing
"What's Your Story, Morning Glory?" (Jack Lawrence, Paul Francis Webster, Hank Williams) – 4:08
"So Rare" (Jerry Herst, Jack Sharpe) – 4:24
"As Long as I Live" (Harold Arlen, Ted Koehler) – 4:36
"Marquita" (Eliseo Grenet) – 3:55
"Stardust" (Hoagy Carmichael, Mitchell Parish) – 5:20
"We'll Be Together Again" (Carl Fischer, Frankie Laine) – 5:04
"Can't We Be Friends?" (Paul James, Kay Swift) – 4:14
"'Deed I Do" (Walter Hirsch, Fred Rose) – 3:55
"'Tis Autumn" (Henry Nemo) – 4:48
"God Bless the Child" (Billie Holiday, Arthur Herzog Jr.) – 3:18

Personnel
 Joe Pass - guitar
 Jimmy Rowles – piano

References

1981 albums
Joe Pass albums
Albums produced by Norman Granz
Pablo Records albums